In general aviation, scud running is a practice in which pilots lower their altitude to avoid clouds or instrument meteorological conditions (IMC). The goal of scud running is to stay clear of weather to continue flying with visual, rather than instrument, references. This practice is widely accepted to be dangerous, and has led to death in many cases from pilots flying into terrain or obstacles, such as masts and towers, normally referred to as controlled flight into terrain, or CFIT; however, even instrument-rated pilots sometimes elect to take the risk to avoid icing or embedded thunderstorms in cloud, or in situations where the minimum instrument altitudes are too high for their aircraft.

Scud running is occasionally described as "maintaining visual contact with the ground while avoiding physical contact with it" or "if the weather's too bad to go IFR, we'll go VFR."  A procedure under instrument flight rules (IFR), called a contact approach, is often referred to as a form of "legalized" scud running.

The term gets its name from scud, which is used to describe small, ragged, low cloud fragments that are unattached to a larger cloud base, and often seen with and behind cold fronts and thunderstorm gust fronts.

Canadian regulations
In Canada, the visibility and altitude requirements are similar to those in the U.S., but most controlled airspace outside of terminal areas bottoms out at  Above Ground Level (AGL), so there is more room to scud run legally.  In northern Canada, there is little controlled airspace at all, below the high-level class A airspace.

US regulations

References

External links
 Scud Running – Discussing a Delicate Subject

Air traffic control